Shek Wai Kok is one of the 19 constituencies in the Tsuen Wan District.

The constituency returns one district councillor to the Tsuen Wan District Council, with an election every four years.

Shek Wai Kok constituency has estimated population of 13,529.

Councillors represented

Election results

2010s

References

Tsuen Wan
Constituencies of Hong Kong
Constituencies of Tsuen Wan District Council
1994 establishments in Hong Kong
Constituencies established in 1994